Nevlya Peak is an ice-covered peak rising to 390 m in Breznik Heights on Greenwich Island in the South Shetland Islands, Antarctica.  Situated 620 m west of Terter Peak, 1.64 km north-northwest of the summit of Ephraim Bluff, 1.15 km east-southeast of the summit of Oborishte Ridge and 1.35 km east of Salash Nunatak.  Overlooking Wulfila Glacier to the west and south.

The peak is named after the settlement of Dolna (Lower) Nevlya in western Bulgaria.

Location
Bulgarian topographic survey Tangra 2004/05 and mapping in 2009.

Map
L.L. Ivanov. Antarctica: Livingston Island and Greenwich, Robert, Snow and Smith Islands. Scale 1:120000 topographic map.  Troyan: Manfred Wörner Foundation, 2009.

Notes

References
 Nevlya Peak. SCAR Composite Gazetteer of Antarctica.
 Bulgarian Antarctic Gazetteer. Antarctic Place-names Commission. (details in Bulgarian, basic data in English)

External links
 Nevlya Peak. Adjusted Copernix satellite image

Mountains of Greenwich Island
Bulgaria and the Antarctic